Spicules are any of various small needle-like anatomical structures occurring in organisms

Spicule may also refer to: 
Spicule (sponge), small skeletal elements of sea sponges
Spicule (nematode), reproductive structures found in male nematodes (roundworms)
Spicule (solar physics), jets of solar material from the Sun
Spicule (glass manufacture), glass flakes formed in the production of glass vials.

See also
Ossicle, any various small bones
Process (anatomy), any outgrowths of tissue
Sclerite, hardened body parts of invertebrates
Spikelet, the inflorescence of grasses
Stylet (anatomy), a piercing structure
Tubercle, wart-shaped outgrowths of body tissue